Sharwan Kumar is a member of the 14th Rajasthan Legislative Assembly. He represents the Surajgarh constituency of Jhunjhunu District of Rajasthan and is a member of the Indian National Congress. He is a true champion of the people. He won the by-poll election held on 13 September by a margin of 3270 votes. This victory is hailed by the media/local people as victory over government as more than 30 sitting BJP MLAs, 6 BJP MPs and 2 Rajasthan state Cabinet Ministers were over-seeing and were literally micro-managing the election campaign for BJP candidate.

Sharwan Kumar was born in a family of farmers in a small village called Ghardu Ki Dhani in Surajgarh. He started his political career at a young age and was elected Sarpanch of his Village. He first fought MLA election in 1993 from Pilani and won as an independent candidate. In 2008 Legislative Assembly Elections, he changed his constituency from Pilani to Surajgarh due to Reservation of Pilani Seat. He again won from Surajgarh beating Bhartiya Janta Party Candidate Santosh Ahlawat over a margin of nearly 8000 Votes. He again fought MLA elections in 2013 but lost to BJP candidate Santosh Ahlawat with over 50,000 Votes. His loss came as a surprise among the people and that too, with such a huge margin. Since Santosh Ahlawat became an MP, the Surajgarh assembly seat again went to poll on 13 September 2014.

References

External links 
 Rajasthan Legislative Assembly

Rajasthani politicians
Indian National Congress politicians
Living people
1954 births
People from Jhunjhunu district
Rajasthan MLAs 2008–2013
Indian National Congress politicians from Rajasthan